HYV may refer to:
 High-yielding variety in agroindustry
 Hindu Yuva Vahini, a Hindu youth group
 Hy-V, a scramjet research program
 Hyvinkää Airfield, in Finland